The history of large-scale slavery in the region which later became the State of Missouri began in 1720, when a French merchant named Philippe François Renault brought about 500 slaves of African descent from Saint-Domingue up the Mississippi River to work in lead mines in what is now southeastern Missouri and southern Illinois. These people were the first enslaved Africans brought en masse to the middle Mississippi River Valley. Prior to Renault's enterprise, slavery in Missouri under French colonial rule had been practiced on a much smaller scale as compared to elsewhere in the French colonies.

Growth 
The institution of slavery only became especially prominent in the area following two major events: the invention of the cotton gin by Eli Whitney in 1793, and the Louisiana Purchase in 1803. These events led to the westward migration of slave-owning American settlers into the area of present-day Missouri and Arkansas, then known as Upper Louisiana. The majority of slave owners in Missouri had moved from worn-out agricultural lands in North Carolina, Tennessee, Kentucky, and Virginia. Still, cotton cultivation, arguably the industry to which slave labor was the most important, was never as well-suited to Missouri's climate as to the rest of the southern United States, and was limited entirely to the most southern parts of the state near the border with present-day Arkansas. Slavery in other areas of Missouri was concentrated in other agricultural industries, such as those for tobacco, hemp, grain, and livestock. Such plantations were concentrated along the Missouri River, particularly in the western half of the state.  A number of slaves were also hired out as stevedores, cabin boys, or deckhands on the ferries of the Mississippi River.

When Louisiana was purchased in 1803, there were between two and three thousand slaves within the present limits of Missouri, of which only the eastern and southern portions were then settled. By 1860 the Black population comprised 9.7% of the state's total including 3572 free negroes and 114,931 who were enslaved. By the beginning of the American Civil War, 32% of counties in Missouri had 1,000 or more enslaved individuals. Male slaves fetched a price of up to $1,300. In the State Auditor's 1860 report, the total value of all enslaved people in Missouri was estimated at approximately US$44,181,912.

Slave codes

Spanish officials established slaves codes in the 1770s. Under U.S. rule, Missouri's territorial slave code was enacted in 1804, a year after the Louisiana Purchase, under which slaves were banned from the use of firearms, participation in unlawful assemblies, or selling alcoholic beverages to other slaves. It also severely punished slaves for participating in riots, insurrections, or disobedience of their masters. It also provided for punishment by mutilation of a slave who sexually assaulted a white woman; a white man who sexually assaulted a female slave of another white man was typically charged with nothing more than trespassing upon her owner's property. The code was retained by the State Constitution of 1820.

At the end of 1824, the Missouri General Assembly passed a law providing a process for enslaved persons to sue for freedom and have some protections in the process. An 1825 law passed by the General Assembly declared blacks incompetent as witnesses in legal cases which involved whites, and testimonies by black witnesses were automatically invalidated. In 1847, an ordinance banning the education of blacks and mulattoes was enacted. Anyone caught teaching a black or mulatto person, whether enslaved or free, was to be fined $500 and serve six months in jail.

Elijah Lovejoy edited an abolitionist newspaper, the Observer, in St. Louis before being driven out by a mob in 1836. He fled across the Mississippi River to Alton, Illinois, where he was later murdered in an exchange of gunfire with a pro-slavery mob.

Dred Scott case
In 1846, one of the nation's most public legal controversies regarding slavery began in St. Louis Circuit Court. Dred Scott, a slave from birth, sued his owner's widow on the basis of a Missouri precedent that held that slaves freed through prolonged residence in a free state or territory would remain free upon returning to Missouri. Scott had spent several years living in Illinois and the Wisconsin Territory with his owner, Dr. John Emerson, before returning to Missouri in 1840. After Emerson's death, Emerson's widow refused to buy Scott's and his family's freedom, so Scott resorted to the legal action permitted him under Missouri's 1824 law.

Scott eventually lost his case in the Missouri Supreme Court, but brought legal suit again in 1853 under federal law. The case was appealed to the United States Supreme Court and became a flashpoint in the ongoing national debate over the legality of slavery. In 1857, the Supreme Court handed down its verdict in Dred Scott v. Sandford: slaves were not citizens, and therefore Scott did not have the right to sue for his family's freedom. The landmark decision found the provisions of the Missouri Compromise of 1820 unconstitutional, and helped to fan the flames of conflict between pro-slavery and anti-slavery factions in the United States. The Scott family was eventually granted freedom by their owners, but Scott died shortly after, in 1858.

Bleeding Kansas and John Brown

Missouri, before 1850, was bordered on the west and northwest with vast and sparsely populated territories obtained via the Louisiana Purchase and the Mexican Cession. When the Kansas-Nebraska Act was passed in 1854, leaving the explosive question of whether new states would be free states or slave states to be decided by "popular sovereignty", Missouri was very involved in trying to "export" slavery to Kansas. Missourians tried to see that Kansas would be a slave state.

On December 20, 1858, John Brown entered northwest Missouri, liberated 11 slaves, took captive two white men, and looted horses and wagons. (See Battle of the Spurs.) The Governor of Missouri announced a reward of $3,000 for his capture. On January 20, 1859, Brown embarked on a lengthy journey to take the liberated slaves to Detroit and then on a ferry to Canada.

The end of slavery in Missouri
As one of the border states during the American Civil War, Missouri was exempt from President Abraham Lincoln's 1863 Emancipation Proclamation decreeing the freedom of slaves in all territory then held by Confederate forces. On January 11, 1865, a state convention approved an ordinance abolishing slavery in Missouri by a vote of 60-4, and later the same day, Governor Thomas C. Fletcher followed up with his own "Proclamation of Freedom". This action effectively marked the end of legal slavery in the state of Missouri.

See also

Marguerite Scypion, a slave of African and Native American descent who sued for her freedom
Missouri Constitutional Convention of 1861-1863

References

Further reading
 Astor, Aaron. Rebels on the Border: Civil War, Emancipation, and the Reconstruction of Kentucky and Missouri (LSU Press, 2012).
 Boman, Dennis K. "The Dred Scott Case Reconsidered: The Legal and Political Context in Missouri." American Journal of Legal History 44 (2000): 405+.
 Burke, Diane Mutti. On Slavery's Border: Missouri's Small Slaveholding Households, 1815-1865 (U of Georgia Press, 2010).
 Dempsey, Terrell. Searching for Jim: Slavery in Sam Clemens's World (University of Missouri Press, 2003) sources used by Mark Twain.
 Frazier, Harriet C. Slavery and crime in Missouri, 1773-1865 (McFarland, 2001).
 Greene, Lorenzo, Gary R. Kremer, and Antonio F. Holland. Missouri’s Black Heritage (2nd ed. University of Missouri Press, 1993).
 Hammond, John Craig, “The Centrality of Slavery: Enslavement and Settler Sovereignty in Missouri, 1770 – 1820” in Jeffrey L. Pasley and John Craig Hammond eds., A Fire Bell in the Past: The Missouri Crisis at 200, Volume I, Western Slavery, National Impasse (University of Missouri Press, 2021)
 Hammond, John Craig, Slavery, Freedom, and Expansion in the Early American West (University of Virginia Press, 2007). 
 Hildebrand, Jennifer. "' I awluz liked dead people, en done all I could for'em': Reconsidering Huckleberry Finn's African and American Identity." Southern Quarterly 47.4 (2010): 151.
 Hurt, R. Douglas. Agriculture and slavery in Missouri's Little Dixie (University of Missouri Press, 1992).
 Harrold, Stanley. Border War: Fighting over Slavery before the Civil War (Univ of North Carolina Press, 2010).
 Kennington, Kelly M. In the Shadow of Dred Scott: St. Louis Freedom Suits and the Legal Culture of Slavery in Antebellum America (University of Georgia Press, 2017).
 McLaurin, Melton. Celia, a Slave (University of Georgia Press, 1991).
 O’Brien, Michael J., and Teresita Majewski. "Wealth and status in the Upper South socioeconomic system of Northeastern Missouri." Historical Archaeology 23.2 (1989): 60-95.
 Phillips, Christopher. The Rivers Ran Backward: The Civil War and the Remaking of the American Middle Border ( Oxford University Press, 2016).
 Poole, Stafford, and Douglas J. Slawson. Church and Slave in Perry County, Missouri, 1818-1865 (Mellen, 1986).
 Stepenoff, Bonnie. From French Community to Missouri Town: Ste. Genevieve in the Nineteenth Century University of Missouri Press, 2006.
 Stone, Jeffrey C. Slavery, southern culture, and education in Little Dixie, Missouri, 1820-1860 (Taylor & Francis, 2006).
 Trexler, Harrison Anthony. Slavery in Missouri, 1804-1865 (Johns Hopkins Press, 1914) online.

External links
 Missoui State Archives "Timeline of Missouri's African American History"
Slavery in Missouri
Another history of slavery in Missouri

 
Missouri in the American Civil War
History of racism in Missouri
MO